The AAP Red Book, or Report of the Committee on Infectious Diseases of the American Academy of Pediatrics, is a hardcover, softcover, and electronic reference to the "manifestations, etiology, epidemiology, diagnosis, and treatment of some 200 childhood infectious diseases".

The Red Book first appeared as an eight-page booklet in 1938.  The most-recent 28th edition, published in 2009, has grown to 984 pages.

External links
AAP Red Book online

Medical manuals